Megacephala is a small genus of beetles in the family Cicindelidae restricted to Africa; it was formerly a much larger genus, but its constituent species (including all of the New World species) have been subsequently placed in other genera, primarily Tetracha, but also Grammognatha, Metriocheila, Phaeoxantha, and Pseudotetracha.

 Megacephala apicespinosa Schüle & Kudrna, 2016
 Megacephala asperata (C.O.Waterhouse, 1877)
 Megacephala baxteri Bates, 1886
 Megacephala bocandei Guerin-Meneville, 1848
 Megacephala catenulata Basilewsky, 1950
 Megacephala denticollis (Chaudoir, 1843)
 Megacephala ertli W.Horn, 1904
 Megacephala hanzelkazikmundi Kudrna, 2015
 Megacephala johnnydeppi Werner, 2007
 Megacephala laevicollis (C.O.Waterhouse, 1880)
 Megacephala megacephala (Olivier, 1790)
 Megacephala morsii (Fairmaire, 1882)
 Megacephala quadrisignata Dejean, 1829
 Megacephala regalis Boheman, 1848
 Megacephala somalica Basilewsky, 1966

References

 
Cicindelidae